Chocolate Genius, Inc. is a musical collective started by Marc Anthony Thompson, a Panamanian singer-songwriter based in New York City. Thompson conceived Chocolate Genius as an alter ego, which then became a music project.

Collective members 
 Marc Anthony Thompson — vocals
 Marc Ribot — guitar
 Jane Scarpantoni — cello
 John Medeski — keyboards
 Chris Wood — bass
 Chris Whitley — guitar
 Vernon Reid — guitar

Albums
Thompson released two solo albums in 1984 and 1989. His self-titled debut album contained his only ever charting single, "So Fine". (No. 101 on the Billboard Bubbling Under the Hot 100 Singles Chart).

Chocolate Genius' first album, Black Music, on V2 Records, was released in 1998, and was considered part of the neo-soul movement. Chocolate Genius included guitarist Marc Ribot, cellist Jane Scarpantoni and other former members of the Lounge Lizards, keyboardist John Medeski and bassist Chris Wood of Medeski, Martin & Wood, guitarists Chris Whitley and Vernon Reid.

In 2001, Thompson released his next solo album, GodMusic, followed by, in 2005, a switch to Commotion Records and the release of Black Yankee Rock, produced by Craig Street. The album featured many prominent New York musicians, many of whom had appeared on his previous two records: Marc Ribot, Abe Laboriel Jr., David Stone, Glenn Patscha, Me'Shell NdegeOcello, Oren Bloedow, Yuka Honda, and Van Dyke Parks, among others.

Scores
Thompson has scored film and theatre productions. He won an Obie award in sound design for A Huey P. Newton Story in 1997 and has written music for Rikers High (2005), Brother to Brother (2004), Colorvision (2004) (which he hosted in the same year), American Splendor (2003), Urbania (2000), and Twin Falls Idaho (1999). His recording of The Beatles' "Julia" was included on the soundtrack to the film I Am Sam.

In 2006, Thompson was enrolled in the line-up for the Bruce Springsteen with The Seeger Sessions Band Tour, playing acoustic guitar, providing backing vocals and sharing the lead vocals on several songs, including "Eyes on the Prize" and "When The Saints Go Marching In".

In 2010, Thompson released his fourth album, Swansongs (One Little Indian Records/No Format!), as Chocolate Genius Incorporated.

Personal life 
Thompson is the father of actress Tessa Thompson and singer Zsela.

Discography

Marc Anthony Thompson
Marc Anthony Thompson (1984, Warner Bros. Records)
Watts and Paris (1989, Reprise Records)

Chocolate Genius
Black Music (1998, V2 Records)
GodMusic (2001, V2)
Black Yankee Rock (2005, Commotion Records)
Swansongs (2010, One Little Indian Records)
Truth vs. Beauty (2016, NØ FØRMAT!)

Compilation/soundtrack contributions
Crossing Jordan Soundtrack ("Days") (2001, Sony)
Rogue's Gallery: Pirate Ballads, Sea Songs, and Chanteys ("Haul Away Joe") (2006, ANTI-)

References

External links

Scene Missing Magazine interview with Marc Anthony Thompson.
Chocolate Genius at NoDepression.com

Musical groups from New York (state)
Musical collectives
African-American rock musical groups